The Yonaguni language ( Dunan Munui) is a Southern Ryukyuan language spoken by around 400 people on the island of Yonaguni, in the Ryukyu Islands, the westernmost of the chain lying just east of Taiwan. It is most closely related to Yaeyama. As classified by UNESCO, the Yonaguni language is one of the most endangered languages in all of Japan, after the Ainu language.

Phonology

Vowels

The table below shows the vowels present in the Yonaguni language. Vowels which are only allophonic appear in parentheses.

However, its distribution is very limited. Excluding a few interjections, the only morpheme in which it appears is the sentence-final, exclamatory particle do.

Consonants

The table below shows the consonants present in the Yonaguni language. Consonants which are only allophonic appear in parentheses. Plosive and affricate phonemes have three-way contrast between fortis, lenis, and voiced consonants.

Phonological cognates

As a Southern Ryukyuan language, Yonaguni, similar to Miyako and Yaeyama,  has  in place with Standard Japanese , such as Yonaguni  ('stomach, belly'), cognate with Japanese  ('guts, bowels'). Yonaguni also has  where Japanese and other Ryukyuan languages have  (orthographically y). Thus, for example, Yonaguni  ('mountain') is cognate with Japanese and Yaeyama  ('id.'). An entry in the late-15th-century Korean annals Seongjong Taewang Sillok records the local name of the island of Yonaguni in Idu script as 閏伊是麼, which has the Middle Korean reading zjuni sima, with sima glossed in the text as the Japonic word for 'island'. That is direct evidence of an intermediate stage of the fortition - > - > -, leading to the modern name  'Yonaguni'.

The Yonaguni language exhibits intervocalic voicing of plosives, as do many Japonic languages.

Syllable structure

Below is the syllable template for Dunan:

(C (G) ) V1 (V2) (N)

 C = consonant
 G = glide  or 
 V = vowel
 N = moraic nasal

The onset allows for a single consonant with the occasional presence of a glide. The nucleus can contain up to two vowels. The only allowable coda is a moraic nasal.

Writing system

Yonaguni was once written with a unique writing system called Kaidā logograms. However, after conquest by the Ryukyu Kingdom and later annexation by the Empire of Japan, the logograms were replaced by Japanese kana and Kanji.

References

Further reading
高橋俊三. "与那国方言." 言語学大辞典セレクション：日本列島の言語. 三省堂, 1997. Print. 
高橋俊三. "沖縄県八重山郡与那国町の方言の生活語彙." 方言研究叢書. 4 (1975): Print. 
平山輝男, 中本正智. 琉球与那国方言の研究. 東京: 東京堂, 1964. Print. 
高橋俊三. "琉球・与那国方言の語彙". 東京: 法政大学沖縄文化硏究所, 1987. Print. 
西岡敏. "与那国方言の動詞継続相のアクセント対立". 地域研究シリーズ 35, 95-105, 2008. 
加治工真市, 仲原穣. "与那国方言について(与那国島の伝統文化調査研究報告書,加治工真市教授退官記念)". 沖縄芸術の科学 : 沖縄県立芸術大学附属研究所紀要 16, 17-74, 2004

External links
 Yonaguni phrasebook on Wikivoyage

Ryukyuan languages
Endangered languages